Fresh Cut Christmas is an album of Christmas music recorded by country music artist George Strait. The 10 classical Christmas songs were picked by Strait for this album. The album was available exclusively at Hallmark Gold Crown stores during November and December 2006. In one week the album achieved platinum status.

Track listing

Personnel
As listed in liner notes
Eddie Bayers – drums, percussion
Eric Darken – percussion
Stuart Duncan – fiddle, mandolin
Thom Flora – background vocals
Paul Franklin – steel guitar, dobro
Steve Gibson – acoustic guitar, electric guitar
Brent Mason – acoustic guitar, electric guitar
Steve Nathan – piano, Wurlitzer, synthesizer
George Strait – lead vocals
Glenn Worf – bass guitar
Andrea Zonn – background vocals

References 

2006 Christmas albums
George Strait albums
MCA Records albums
Albums produced by Tony Brown (record producer)
Christmas albums by American artists
Country Christmas albums